Walihan Sailike ( born 3 March 1992, Emin County) is a Chinese Greco-Roman wrestler of Kazakh ethnicity. He won one of the bronze medal in the 60 kg event at the 2020 Summer Olympics held in Tokyo, Japan.

In 2018, he won one of the bronze medals in the 60 kg event at the World Wrestling Championships held in Budapest, Hungary. He also competed in the men's Greco-Roman 60 kg event at the 2018 Asian Games held in Jakarta, Indonesia. In 2019, he competed in the 60 kg event at the World Wrestling Championships held in Nur-Sultan, Kazakhstan.

Major results

References

External links 
 

Living people
1992 births
Sportspeople from Xinjiang
Chinese male sport wrestlers
World Wrestling Championships medalists
Wrestlers at the 2018 Asian Games
Asian Games competitors for China
Wrestlers at the 2020 Summer Olympics
Olympic wrestlers of China
Medalists at the 2020 Summer Olympics
Olympic medalists in wrestling
Olympic bronze medalists for China
Chinese people of Kazakhstani descent
21st-century Chinese people